A diva is a celebrated female singer.

Diva may also refer to:

People
 Diva Montelaba (born 1991), Filipino actress
 Diva Tarkas, Indonesian footballer
 Diva Zappa (born 1979), American musician
 Diva, American rapper from female rap group H.W.A.

Books
 Diva (José de Alencar novel) (1864), by José de Alencar
 Diva (Odier novel), by Daniel Odier
 Diva, a character in the anime series Blood+
 Diva, a comic book character in the Stormwatch universe
 Diva (magazine), a UK magazine for lesbians

Film and television
 The Diva, a 1929 German silent film
 Diva, winged cyborg-like angel from Cyber Team in Akihabara
 Diva (1981 film), a 1981 film based on the Daniel Odier novel
 Diva (2007 film), a 2007 Malaysian film
 Diva (2020 film), a South Korean film
 "Diva" (Glee), a 2013 episode of Glee
 Diva (2010 TV series), a 2010 musical drama television series
 Diva Universal, a woman-based entertainment channel owned by Universal Networks International
 Diva TV, a British TV channel

Music 
 Diva (South Korean band), South Korean girl group 1997–2005
 Diva (Japanese band), a sub-unit of all-female Japanese pop group AKB48
 Diva Records, a record label
 VH1 Divas, a series of televised concerts of popular music

Albums and songs
 Diva (Marcia Hines album), 2001
 Diva (Ivy Queen album), 2003
 Diva (Jelena Karleuša album), 2012 
 Diva (Annie Lennox album), 1992
 Diva (My Sister's Machine album), 1992
 "Diva" (After School song), 2009
 "Diva" (Beyoncé song), 2009
 "Diva" (Cir.Cuz song), 2011
 "Diva" (Dana International song), 1998
 "Diva" (Lali song), 2022
 "Diva", a section of Arca's 2020 single "@@@@@"

Technology
 Digital Interface for Video and Audio, a digital interface for video and audio
 Diva (car manufacturer), a UK sports car manufacturer in the 1960s
 DIVA software, software which allows the spatial interpolation/gridding of data in an optimal way
 DTA Diva, a French ultralight trike wing design
 Bognor Diva, a Uruguayan version of the off-road vehicle Lada Niva
 D.Va, a fictional hero appearing in the 2016 video game Overwatch
 Hatsune Miku: Project DIVA, a rhythm game series made by Sega

Other uses
 D.C. Divas, a team in the Women's Football Alliance
 Diva cup, a brand name of a menstrual cup
 DIVA, an accessories chain of Castro (clothing)
 Diva Junction railway station, a railway station in Mumbai
 DIVA Museum for Diamonds, Jewellery and Silver in Antwerp
 WWE Diva, a branding term for women wrestlers, managers, interviewers, or ring announcers in World Wrestling Entertainment
 Diva, a town near Mumbai, in state of Maharashtra, India

See also
 Deva (disambiguation)
 Devi, the female aspect of the divine in Hinduism
 Divo (disambiguation)
 La Diva (disambiguation)